Fei'eling station, is a station of and the current western terminus of Line 9 of the Guangzhou Metro, located in Huadu District. It started operations on 28 December 2017, and is the westernmost Guangzhou Metro station that lies within the sub-provincial administrative area of Guangzhou.

Station layout

Exits

References

Railway stations in China opened in 2017
Guangzhou Metro stations in Huadu District